The Renault R-Space is a concept small family car designed by Renault for the 2011 Geneva Motor Show and is a similar size to the production Renault Mégane. It was designed by Renault's design chief Laurens Van den Acker and has handclap suicide doors that reveal a large single opening without a B-pillar.

Technical details

The R-Space is powered by a 900cc turbo three-cylinder mated to a twin-clutch gearbox. The body boasts a low 0.28 drag coefficient.

As a small family car, the interior incorporated innovative features such as a floating dashboard design and a rear cabin that has been designed for children with motorised cubes that can change into a number of shapes such as a booster seat and a table. The design is almost similar to the Renault Mégane III, it is a 5-door hatchback (four door, front engine). The Renault R-Space has suicide doors that reveal a single opening without a B-pillar and it has 5 seats that it has 2 suicide doors that open backward and it has a boot that opens upward like most hatchbacks.

The Autofacíl magazine of Spain assumed the car will be released in late 2012, as a successor to the Renault Modus. The Renault R-Space will enter production in mid-June 2016 to be built alongside the future minivan Renault Scénic IV.

References

External links
Renault R-Space official website

R-Space
Cars introduced in 2011
Front-wheel-drive vehicles
Compact cars
Hatchbacks